Events in 1987 in Japanese television.

Debuts

Ongoing shows
Music Fair, music (1964–present)
Mito Kōmon, jidaigeki (1969-2011)
Sazae-san, anime (1969–present)
Ōoka Echizen, jidaigeki (1970-1999)
FNS Music Festival, music (1974-present)
Panel Quiz Attack 25, game show (1975–present)
Doraemon, anime (1979-2005)
Maison Ikkoku, anime (1986-1988)
Dragon Ball, anime (1986–1989)
Saint Seiya, anime (1986–1989)

Endings

TV specials

See also
1987 in anime
List of Japanese television dramas
1987 in Japan
List of Japanese films of 1987

References